General Jacob may refer to:

Claud Jacob (1863–1948), British Indian Army general
Ian Jacob (1899–1993), British Army lieutenant general
J. F. R. Jacob (1921–2016), Indian Army lieutenant general
John Jacob (East India Company officer) (1812–1858), British East India Company brigadier general

See also
Petrus Jacobs (1910-1967), South African Army major general